Taylors Bridge is an unincorporated community in Appoquinimink Hundred and Blackbird Hundred, New Castle County, Delaware, United States. It is named for the bridge that carries Route 9 over the Blackbird Creek, the boundary between the two hundreds.

References

Unincorporated communities in New Castle County, Delaware
Unincorporated communities in Delaware